Siomara Girón was the acting first lady of Honduras from June 28, 2009, to January 27, 2010.

First lady following events of mid-2009
The 2009 Honduran political crisis of June 28, 2009 propelled her husband Roberto Micheletti to the presidency of Honduras.

Family background
She married Roberto Micheletti on August 12, 1993, and they have three children.

References

See also

 Roberto Micheletti#Family background

Living people
First ladies of Honduras
1959 births
People from Yoro Department
20th-century Honduran women
21st-century Honduran women